The 2013–14 Fairleigh Dickinson Knights men's basketball team represented Fairleigh Dickinson University during the 2013–14 NCAA Division I men's basketball season. The team was led by first year head coach Greg Herenda. He is the seventh head coach in the programs history. The Knights played their home games at the Rothman Center and were members of the Northeast Conference. they finished the season 10–21, 6–10 in Northeast Conference play to finish in eighth place. They lost in the quarterfinals of the Northeast Conference tournament to Robert Morris.

Roster

Schedule

|-
!colspan=9 style="background:#800020; color:#FFFFFF;"| Regular season

|-
!colspan=9 style="background:#800020; color:#FFFFFF;"| 2014 Northeast Conference tournament

References

Fairleigh Dickinson Knights men's basketball seasons
Fairleigh Dickinson
Fairleigh Dickinson Knights men's b
Fairleigh Dickinson Knights men's b